Dénys Bain (born 2 July 1993) is a French professional footballer who plays as a defender for  club Auxerre.

Career
Bain made his senior debut as a 17-year-old for Châteauroux, coming on for the final four minutes in a 1–0 win over Sedan in Ligue 2 on 20 May 2011.

On 28 August 2015, Bain joined Ligue 2 side Le Havre on a four-year contract.

On 6 July 2022, Bain signed for Ligue 1 side Auxerre on a one-year contract with an option for a further year.

Personal life
Born in France, Bain is of Beninese descent.

Career statistics

References

External links

1993 births
Living people
Footballers from Paris
French footballers
French sportspeople of Beninese descent
Black French sportspeople
Association football defenders
Ligue 1 players
Ligue 2 players
Championnat National players
Championnat National 3 players
LB Châteauroux players
Le Havre AC players
Stade Brestois 29 players
AJ Auxerre players